BTLP  may refer to:

 Barcelona Traction, Light, and Power Company, a corporation that controlled light and power utilities in Spain
 Grammy Award for Best Tropical Latin Performance, a Grammy Award presented annually between 1995 and 1999